"...To Save Us All from Satan's Power" is the 36th episode of the HBO original series The Sopranos and the 10th of the show's third season. It was written by Robin Green and Mitchell Burgess, and directed by Jack Bender, and originally aired on April 29, 2001.

Starring
 James Gandolfini as Tony Soprano
 Lorraine Bracco as Dr. Jennifer Melfi
 Edie Falco as Carmela Soprano
 Michael Imperioli as Christopher Moltisanti
 Dominic Chianese as Corrado Soprano, Jr.
 Steven Van Zandt as Silvio Dante
 Tony Sirico as Paulie Gualtieri
 Jamie-Lynn Sigler as Meadow Soprano
 Robert Iler as Anthony Soprano, Jr.
 Drea de Matteo as Adriana La Cerva *
 Aida Turturro as Janice Soprano
 John Ventimiglia as Artie Bucco
 Kathrine Narducci as Charmaine Bucco
 Steven R. Schirripa as Bobby Baccalieri
 Federico Castelluccio as Furio Giunta
 Robert Funaro as Eugene Pontecorvo

* = credit only

Guest starring
 Jerry Adler as Hesh Rabkin

Also guest starring
 Vitali Baganov as Valery
 Joe Badulucco as Jimmy Altieri (flashback sequences)
 Jason Cerbone as Jackie Aprile, Jr.
 Matthew Cerbone as  Young Jackie Aprile, Jr. (flashback sequences)
 Andrew Davoli as Dino Zerilli
 John Fiore as Gigi Cestone (flashback sequences)
 Dan Grimaldi as Patsy Parisi
 George Loros as Ray Curto
 Vincent Pastore as Big Pussy Bonpensiero (flashback sequences)
 Turk Pipkin as Aaron Arkaway
 Michael Rispoli as Jackie Aprile, Sr (flashback sequences)
 Alik Sakharov as Agron
 Maureen Van Zandt as Gabriella Dante
 Joe Pucillo as Beppy Scerbo (flashback sequences)
 Frank Ciornei as Slava Malevsky

Synopsis
Tony is on the Asbury Park boardwalk, where he is going to meet Paulie. While waiting, he remembers another meeting there five years ago, in 1995, with Pussy and Jackie Aprile, Sr. At the time there was a dispute between Jackie and Junior, and Pussy had been in Boca Raton, Florida arranging a sitdown. However, Pussy did not go to the sitdown, and Tony thinks that was when the FBI flipped him; he believes they had him wear a wire when he dressed up as Santa. Now they need a new Santa and Bobby is compelled to play the part. He is shy, unhappy, and gauche.

When Tony is visiting Janice she starts complaining about a pain in her wrist, which might need an operation, caused by the Russian thug who came to take back Svetlana's prosthetic leg. Tony obtains his name and place of work, and he and Furio beat him up and throw him through the glass window of a store's Christmas display. Janice is badly shaken when she sees on TV what her brother has done.

Charmaine, newly separated from Artie, looks glamorous at Nuovo Vesuvio. Tony compliments her, but she responds by blaming him for changes in Artie's character. He angrily walks out, along with Christopher and Silvio. They go to a strip club. Jackie Jr. is there, getting a lap dance.  Enraged, Tony takes him to the bathroom and beats him up. He confiscates the gun Ralphie gave him, and knees him in the groin, leaving him on the floor.

On Christmas morning, the Sopranos are opening their gifts when Jackie arrives with presents from his mother, and his own present for  Meadow, an engraved necklace. She ostentatiously embraces and kisses him, while he glances at Tony. Alone with Tony, Jackie tells him he has flunked out of Rutgers but believes he can be a serious student of men's fashion. He says, "I'm sorry," again and again. Tony says, "I haven't decided what to do with you."  After Jackie leaves, Tony has to fake amusement when Meadow gives him her present, a Big Mouth Billy Bass.

Title reference
 The episode's title is taken from a verse of the Christmas carol "God Rest Ye Merry, Gentlemen".

Cultural references
Christopher states that there is significant money in the Grinch, and references the choice to cast Jim Carrey as the Grinch.
The OJ Simpson Trial is shown throughout the 1995 flashback scenes.

References to prior episodes
 The Big Mouth Billy Bass, including the song "Take Me to the River", was previously featured in the episode "Second Opinion".
 The Asbury Park boardwalk in winter, along with the view of the sea closing the episode, was previously featured in "Funhouse".

Music 
The song played over the end credits is "I've Got a Feeling" by the American Sacred Steel gospel group, The Campbell Brothers with Katie Jackson.
During the 1995 Christmas flashback at Satriale's, the jukebox was playing "The Chipmunk Song (Christmas Don't Be Late)", by The Chipmunks.
 The song Silvio has turned off in the Bada Bing is "The Cycle" from Virgos Merlot's Signs of a Vacant Soul album.
 "Funky Drummer Boy", a remixed version of "The Little Drummer Boy" from Thornetta Davis plays at the rival strip club where Tony beats up Jackie Jr.
 The song playing while Bobby Baccalà is playing Santa is "Santa Baby" by Eartha Kitt.
 The song playing while Tony, Silvio, and Paulie are eating in Vesuvio is "White Christmas" by The Drifters.

External links
"...To Save Us All from Satan's Power" at HBO

The Sopranos (season 3) episodes
American Christmas television episodes
2001 American television episodes